Ingolf Kuntze (1890–1952) was a German stage and film actor. He was active as a character actor, appearing in supporting roles in a number of films during the Nazi era.

Selected filmography
 A Woman Branded (1931)
 And Who Is Kissing Me? (1933)
 Rivalen der Luft (1934)
 Winter in the Woods (1936)
 The Blue Fox (1938)
 Secret Code LB 17 (1938)
 The Secret Lie (1938)
 The Green Emperor (1939)
 Renate in the Quartet (1939)
 Escape in the Dark (1939)
 The Governor (1939)
 Uproar in Damascus (1939)
 Kora Terry (1940)
 The Girl from Barnhelm (1940)
 The Silent Guest (1945)
 Amico (1949)
 The Murder Trial of Doctor Jordan (1949)

References

Bibliography 
 Rolf Giesen. Nazi Propaganda Films: A History and Filmography. McFarland, 2003.

External links 
 

1890 births
1952 deaths
German male film actors
German male stage actors
Actors from Saxony
People from Hainichen, Saxony